Neville Broderick (10 April 1927 – 17 February 1994) was an Australian rules footballer who played with Collingwood and Fitzroy in the Victorian Football League (VFL).

Early career
Broderick was a defender and spent three seasons at Collingwood. He crossed to Fitzroy in 1952 and won their Best and fairest in his debut season with the club.

Tasmania
In 1955 Broderick moved to Tasmania being cleared to Wynyard to take on the role of captain-coach. He also won that club's Best and Fairest award in 1958.

References

External links

1927 births
Collingwood Football Club players
Fitzroy Football Club players
Mitchell Medal winners
Wynyard Football Club players
Wynyard Football Club coaches
Australian rules footballers from Victoria (Australia)
1994 deaths